Italy national rugby team may refer to national teams in the different varieties of rugby:

 Italy national rugby union team, often nicknamed the Azzurri, administered by the Federazione Italiana Rugby.
 Italy national rugby sevens team compete in the World Sevens Series
 Italy national rugby league team, administered by Italian Rugby League XIII.